Francesco Falabella (1599–1670) was a Roman Catholic prelate who served as Archbishop of Santa Severina (1660–1670).

Biography
Francesco Falabella was born in Lagoni Policastro, Italy in 1599.
On 5 April 1660, he was appointed during the papacy of Pope Alexander VII as Archbishop of Santa Severina.
On 11 April 1660, he was consecrated bishop Marcello Santacroce, Bishop of Tivoli, with Giuseppe Ciantes, Bishop Emeritus of Marsico Nuovo, and Giovanni Agostino Marliani, Bishop Emeritus of Accia and Mariana, serving as co-consecrators. 
He served as Archbishop of Santa Severina until his death in June 1670.

References

External links and additional sources
 (for Chronology of Bishops) 
 (for Chronology of Bishops) 

17th-century Italian Roman Catholic archbishops
Bishops appointed by Pope Alexander VII
1599 births
1670 deaths